Manibhadresvara Siva temple is located in Bhubaneswar, Orissa, India.

It was built around 14th century A.D. and is located at Latitude of 20 degree 14’ 45" N., Longitude of 85 degree 50’ 14" E.,and Elevation of 55 ft and is situated in the eastern embankment of Bindusagar tank. It is on the right side of the road branching from Kedara-Gouri to Lingaraja
temple. The enshrined deity is a Siva-lingam within a circular yoni pitha at the centre of sanctum. The temple is facing towards north.

Significance

Historic significance  

Local people ascribe the temple to the Kesaris (Samavamsis), that architecture does not conform to local legend.

Cultural significance 
Rituals like Sankranti are celebrated in the temple.

Social significance  

Sradha, pindadana, mundanakriya are also performed in the temple .

Physical description

Surrounding 

The temple is surrounded by Bindusagar tank in the west and Dalmiya Dharmasala in south-east at a distance of 20.00 m across the road.

Architectural features 

On plan, the temple has a pidha Vimana measuring 1.70 m2 and stands on a low pista with a height of 0.38 m. On elevation,
the vimana has bada, gandi and mastaka measuring 2.42 m in height from bottom to the top. With threefold division of the bada
the temple has a trianga bada measuring 1.26 meters height. The pabhaga, jangha and baranda measures 0.38 m, 0.71 m and 0.17 m
in height respectively. The gandi measures 1.00 m and mastaka 0.16 m in height.

Building techniques 
It is built with Laterite by Dry masonry Construction techniques and kalingan style.

References 

 Indira Gandhi National Centre For The Arts: Archaeological sites of Orissa
 www.eodissa.com
 Book: Lesser Known Monuments of Bhubaneswar by Dr. Sadasiba Pradhan

Hindu temples in Bhubaneswar